You Can't Win may refer to:

 "You Can't Win" (song), a song by Michael Jackson from the film The Wiz
 You Can't Win (album), an album by Dolorean, or the title song
 "You Can't Win", a song by Iron Butterfly from Heavy
 "You Can't Win", a song by Kelly Clarkson from Stronger
 "You Can't Win", a song by Tomahawk from Mit Gas
 You Can't Win (book), a 1926 autobiography by Jack Black
 You Can't Win (1961 TV series), a UK anthology series featuring Donald Tandy in one installment
 You Can't Win (1966 TV series), a UK series based on the novels of William Cooper
 You Can't Win (1948 film), a film nominated for the 1948 Academy Award for Best Live Action Short Film
 You Can't Win, a 1970 story of The Railway Series book Duke the Lost Engine

See also 
 "Can't Win", a song by Richard Thompson from Amnesia